Wahoo Municipal Airport  is two miles northeast of Wahoo, in Saunders County, Nebraska. It is owned by the Wahoo Airport Authority. The FAA's National Plan of Integrated Airport Systems for 2009–2013 classified it as a general aviation airport.

Many U.S. airports use the same three-letter location identifier for the FAA and IATA, but this airport is AHQ to the FAA and has no IATA code.

Facilities
It has two runways: 2/20 is 4,100 by 75 feet (1,250 x 23 m) concrete and 13/31 is 3,290 by 150 feet (1,003 x 46 m) turf.

In the year ending August 13, 2008 the airport had 16,350 aircraft operations, average 44 per day: 99% general aviation and 1% military. 32 aircraft were then based at the airport: 84% single-engine, 6% multi-engine and 9% ultralight.

References

External links 
 Aerial photo as of 4 April 1999 from USGS The National Map
 
 

Airports in Nebraska
Buildings and structures in Saunders County, Nebraska